Cro-Magnon is a general term for European early modern humans.

Cro-Magnon may also refer to:
the Abri de Cro-Magnon archaeological site
the human fossils discovered there:
"Old Man of Cro-Magnon", "Cro-Magnon Man", the fossil Cro-Magnon 1
"Woman of Cro-Magnon", the fossil Cro-Magnon 2
"Cro-Magnon Man", or "Cro-Magnons"; an obsolete term for anatomically modern humans in general

In popular culture:
Cromagnon (band), a 1960s American band
The Cro-Magnons, a Japanese rock band
Cro-Mags, American hardcore punk band
"Cro-Magnon", an episode of the Ally McBeal television series
Cromagnon man, a song by Snout (band)

See also
The República Cromañón nightclub fire in Argentina
Magnon (disambiguation)
Cro (disambiguation)